The 29th World Science Fiction Convention (Worldcon), also known as Noreascon I, was held on 2–6 September 1971 at the Sheraton-Boston Hotel in Boston, Massachusetts, United States.

The chairman was Tony Lewis.

Participants 

Attendance was approximately 1,600.

Guests of Honor 

 Clifford D. Simak (pro)
 Harry Warner, Jr. (fan)
 Robert Silverberg (toastmaster)

Awards

1971 Hugo Awards 

 Best Novel: Ringworld by Larry Niven
 Best Novella: "Ill Met in Lankhmar" by Fritz Leiber
 Best Short Story: "Slow Sculpture" by Theodore Sturgeon
 Best Professional Magazine: Fantasy & Science Fiction
 Best Professional Artist: Leo Dillon and Diane Dillon
 Best Fanzine: Locus, edited by Charles N. Brown and Dena Brown
 Best Fan Writer: Richard E. Geis
 Best Fan Artist: Alicia Austin

Notes 

The convention is mentioned in the preface to The Ringworld Engineers for the MIT students who pointed out that the Ringworld would be unstable.

See also 

 Hugo Award
 Science fiction
 Speculative fiction
 World Science Fiction Society
 Worldcon

References

External links 

 Noreascon website
 NESFA.org: The Long List
 NESFA.org: 1971 convention notes 
 Hugo.org: 1971 Hugo Awards
 Audio from the 1971 Hugo Awards ceremony at Noreascon I

1971 conferences
1971 in Boston
Conventions in Boston
Science fiction conventions in the United States
September 1971 events in the United States
Worldcon